William Alexander Woodburn (8 August 1919 – 2 December 2001) was a Scottish footballer who played for Rangers and Scotland. He was the last footballer in Britain to receive a life ban from the game for indiscipline, although the ban was later rescinded and he has since been inducted into both the Scottish Football Hall of Fame and the Rangers Hall of Fame.

Football career

Rangers
Born in Edinburgh, he played for junior side Edinburgh Ashton before signing as a professional for Rangers in October 1937. He made his debut on 20 August 1938 in a 2–2 draw in the League against Motherwell and made 12 appearances as the club won the league title. After World War II (during which numerous trophies made their way to Ibrox, although Woodburn was considered a reserve player for part of that time), he established himself in the Rangers side and won four more Scottish league championships and four Scottish Cups with the club as a member of its strong defensive unit known as the 'Iron Curtain'. He appeared in the first Scottish League Cup Final in April 1947, when Rangers beat Aberdeen 4–0 and won it a second time two years later.

In 1947 he received a 14-day ban for a "violent exchange" with Motherwell's Davie Mathie, then in 1953 he punched the Clyde striker Billy McPhail, which earned a 21-day ban. Later that year, Woodburn was sent off for retaliation in a match with Stirling Albion. The clubs met again the following season in a League Cup tie at Ibrox on 28 August 1954. Playing with a knee injury, Woodburn took exception to a bad foul and retaliated by headbutting a Stirling player. The Scottish Football Association convened a disciplinary hearing the following month, which lasted just four minutes, and Woodburn was suspended sine die. The England international Tom Finney, one of many well-known forwards Woodburn had encountered in his international career, described the ban as "a grave injustice". The SFA revoked their punishment three years later, but by then Woodburn was 37 and his playing career was over.

Scotland
Woodburn won 24 international caps for Scotland between 1947 and 1952. He made his debut in a 1–1 draw with England at Wembley. Woodburn also appeared seven times for the Scottish League XI.

Post retirement
After his retirement from football Woodburn ran a garage business before becoming a sportswriter with the News of the World.

Career statistics

International appearances

See also
List of Scotland national football team captains

References

External links

1919 births
2001 deaths
Footballers from Edinburgh
Rangers F.C. players
Musselburgh Athletic F.C. players
Scottish Football League players
Scottish Junior Football Association players
Scottish footballers
Scotland international footballers
Scottish sportswriters
Scottish Football Hall of Fame inductees
Association football central defenders
Scottish Football League representative players
Banned sportspeople
News of the World people